Mount Barwell is a summit in Alberta, Canada.

Mount Barwell has the name of C. S. W. Barwell, a government surveyor.

References

Barwell
Alberta's Rockies